A program book is a printed schedule of meeting events, locations of function rooms, location of exhibitors, and other pertinent information pertaining to a convention or conference. It is customary in many cases to sell advertising in program books to cover part of the costs of operation.

Usage 
Program books are used at events where the use of a phone would be disruptive, where the attendee base is an older demographic that are less likely to use a phone or app, or when the event map is unintuitive or the event spans multiple days or venues.

References 

Meetings
Conventions (meetings)
Social events